Penstowe Castle, also called Kilkhampton Castle, was a medieval fortification built near Kilkhampton, Cornwall,  England, possibly during the years of the civil war in the 12th century known as the Anarchy.

History

The precise date of Penstowe Castle's construction is uncertain, but it was built during the years of the Anarchy in the mid-12th century, either by Robert, 1st Earl of Gloucester, feudal baron of Gloucester, who was certainly the tenant-in-chief of the manor of Kilkhampton, or by his tenants and relatives the Grenville family (possibly Sir Richard I de Grenville (d.post 1142) of Neath Castle, Glamorgan), which held the manor of Kilkhampton and the manor of Bideford in Devon from the Honour of Gloucester.  Stowe House was the Grenvilles' residence at Kilkhampton, demolished and rebuilt in grand form in 1679 by John Granville, 1st Earl of Bath (1628-1701).

Kilkhampton Castle was built to a motte and bailey design, positioned on a knoll and protected by steep slopes on the north and south sides. The configuration of baileys is unusual, although similar to nearby Eastleigh Berries Castle. A D-shaped building was located on top of the motte.

Archaeological excavations were carried out in 1925 and in the early 1950s. In the 21st century the site is protected under law as a scheduled monument.

See also

Castles in Great Britain and Ireland
List of castles in England

References

References

Bibliography

 

Castles in Cornwall
Scheduled monuments in Cornwall